Eremopyprgus is a genus of very small freshwater snails, aquatic gastropod mollusks in the family Cochliopidae.

Species
Species within the genus Eremopyprgus include:
Eremopyrgus eganensis Hershler, 1999
Eremopyrgus elegans Hershler, Liu & Lande, 2002

References

 Hershler R., Liu H.-P. & Landye J. J. (2002). "A new species of Eremopyrgus (Hydrobiidae: Cochliopinae) from the Chihuahuan desert, Mexico: Phylogentic relationships and biogeography". Journal of Molluscan Studies 68: 7-13. PDF.

Cochliopidae